Maximilian Lechner (born 27 May 1990) is an Austrian professional pool player. 

Lechner has been successful on the Euro Tour, where he has reached the last 16 at the 2017 Dutch Open, 2017 Treviso Open, 2018 Leende Open, 2018 Sankt Johann im Pongau Open, as well as reaching the quarter finals of the 2017 Klagenfurt Open before reaching semifinals at both and 2018 Treviso Open and 2019 Leende Open.

Titles & Achievements
 Austrian Pool Championship
 Nine-Ball (2010, 2011, 2016)
 Eight-Ball (2008, 2009)
 Straight Pool (2008, 2009)
 Ten-Ball (2010)

References

External links

Austrian pool players
Living people
Austrian sportspeople
1990 births
Place of birth missing (living people)